The Air Force Cross of Aeronautical Merit is an order granted by Colombia, established in 1948. The order is awarded for distinguished service to the Colombian Air Force.

History
Established by Decree 1068 of 20 March 1948, the Air Force Cross of Aeronautical Merit was originally known as the Order of Aeronautical Merit Antonio Ricaurte.

Criteria
The Air Force Cross of Aeronautical Merit is primarily awarded to Colombian Air Force personnel, but may be awarded to members of the Colombian Armed Forces or Colombian National Police. It may also be awarded to foreign civilian and military personnel. Individuals are recognized for valor and military virtue, as well as distinguished and notable service to the Colombian Air Force.

Grades
The Air Force Cross of Aeronautical Merit is awarded in the following grades:
 Grand Cross (Gran Cruz)
 Grand Officer (Gran Oficial)
 Commander (Comendador)
 Officer (Oficial)
 Knight (Caballero)
 Companion (Compañero)

References

Orders, decorations, and medals of Colombia